The January 1966 Commonwealth Prime Ministers' Conference was the 15th Meeting of the Heads of Government of the Commonwealth of Nations. It was the first such meeting to be held outside of the United Kingdom, being held in Lagos, Nigeria, and was hosted by that country's Prime Minister, Sir Abubakar Tafawa Balewa.

The sole purpose of the meeting was to discuss the white minority rule regime in the rogue British colony of Rhodesia and the means by which multi-racial rule could be achieved.

References

1966
Diplomatic conferences in Nigeria
20th-century diplomatic conferences
1966 in international relations
20th century in Lagos
1966 conferences
January 1966 events in Africa
1966 in Nigeria
Nigeria and the Commonwealth of Nations